Bot may refer to:

Sciences

Computing and technology
 Chatbot, a computer program that converses in natural language
 Internet bot, a software application that runs automated tasks (scripts) over the Internet
a Spambot, an internet bot designed to assist in the sending of spam
 Internet Relay Chat bot, a set of scripts or an independent program that connects to Internet Relay Chat as a client
 Robot, or "bot", a mechanical device that can perform physical tasks
 Social bot, a type of chatbot that is employed in social media networks to automatically generate messages
Twitter bot, a program used to produce automated posts on the Twitter microblogging service
 Trading bot, a program in an Automated trading system that is linked to an exchange or broker that automates trading using algorithms, there are trading bot providers such as HaasOnline, Cryptohopper, and MetaTrader 4
 Video game bot, a computer-controlled player or opponent
 Wikipedia bot, an internet bot which performs tasks in Wikipedia
 Zombie (computer science), a zombie computer is part of a botnet

Biology and medicine
 BOT, base of tongue, in medicine
 Bot, the lesion caused by a botfly larva
Borderline ovarian tumor, a tumor of the ovaries

Places
 Bni Ounjel Tafraout, a commune in Taounate Province, Taza-Al Hoceima-Taounate, Morocco
 Bot, Tarragona, a town in Spain
 Bot River, South Africa
 Botswana, IOC and FIFA trigram BOT
 British Overseas Territories, territories under the jurisdiction and sovereignty of the United Kingdom
 Bucharest Old Town

People
 Ajaw B'ot, 8th century Maya king of the city of Seibal
 Ben Bot, Dutch politician
 G. W. Bot, Australian printmaker, sculptor, painter and graphic artist
 Jeanne Bot, French supercentenarian
 Theo Bot, Dutch politician

Brands and enterprises
 Bank of Taiwan, a bank headquartered in Taipei, Taiwan
 Bank of Tanzania, the central bank of the United Republic of Tanzania
 Bank of Thailand, the central bank of Thailand
 Blue Orange Theatre, an independent theatre in Birmingham, England
 Bolt On Technology, an American software development company
 The Bank of Tokyo, a defunct Japanese bank now part of The Bank of Tokyo-Mitsubishi UFJ
 Bot, a line of budget desktop PCs manufactured by Alienware

Business 
 Balance of trade, difference between the monetary value of exports and imports
 Build–operate–transfer, a form of project financing

Sports
 Bobby Orr Trophy, the championship trophy of the Eastern Conference of the Ontario Hockey League
 Brava Opening Tournament, a football tournament in Brava, Cape Verde

Transportation
 Air Botswana (ICAO: BOT)
 Bosset Airport (IATA: BOT), in Bosset, Papua New Guinea
 Bryn Oer Tramway, a narrow gauge railway built in South Wales in 1814

Other uses
"B.O.T.", a 1986 episode of The Transformers
 Bot caste, a Hindu caste of Nepali origin found in the Indian state of Uttar Pradesh
 Bot people, or Boto people, a community in Jammu and Kashmir
 Bot, short for ubosot, the ordination hall of a Buddhist temple in Thailand
 Barn Owl Trust, a charity in Waterleat, Ashburton, Devon, England
 Bon Om Touk, the Cambodian Water Festival

See also 
 
 Bots (disambiguation)
 Bott (disambiguation)
 Break On Through (disambiguation)
 Burr Oak Township (disambiguation)
 Robot (disambiguation)